Aleksandr Malyutin (born 13 June 1939) is a Soviet athlete. He competed in the men's pole vault at the 1968 Summer Olympics.

References

1939 births
Living people
Athletes (track and field) at the 1968 Summer Olympics
Soviet male pole vaulters
Olympic athletes of the Soviet Union
Place of birth missing (living people)